Dance-rock is a dance-infused genre of rock music. It is a post-disco genre connected with pop rock and post-punk with fewer rhythm and blues influences. It originated in the early 1980s, following the decline in popularity of both punk and disco.

Examples of early dance-rock include Gina X's "No G.D.M.", Russ Ballard's "On the Rebound", artists such as Dinosaur L, Liquid Liquid and Polyrock, and the compilation album Disco Not Disco.

Definitions
Michael Campbell, in his book Popular Music in America, defines the genre as "post-punk/post-disco fusion". Campbell also cited Robert Christgau, who described dance-oriented rock (or DOR) as an umbrella term used by various DJs in the 1980s.

However, AllMusic defines "dance-rock" as 1980s and 1990s music practiced by rock musicians, influenced by Philly soul, disco and funk, fusing those styles with rock and dance. Artists like the Rolling Stones, David Bowie, Duran Duran, Simple Minds, INXS, Eurythmics, Depeche Mode, the Clash, New Order and Devo belong, according to AllMusic, to this genre. Dance-rock embraces some experimental funk acts like A Certain Ratio, Gang of Four, and also mainstream musicians, for example Robert Palmer, Billy Idol and Hall & Oates.

History
Despite predictions that rock music would replace disco in the dance clubs, a mix of post-disco, post-punk and new wave took its place instead. The first wave of artists arrived with New Order, Prince, the Human League, Blondie, Tom Tom Club (consisting of two members from Talking Heads) and Devo, followed by Daryl Hall & John Oates, Thompson Twins, Haircut 100, ABC, Depeche Mode and Spandau Ballet. The scene also produced many crossovers, including Kraftwerk getting R&B audiences with their 1981 influential album Computer World, which paved the way for Afrika Bambaataa's "Planet Rock" and electro in general. Reinstated interest in dance-rock and post-disco caused popularity of 12-inch singles and EPs around that era.

Key influences of the genre include New Romantic synthpop acts Human League and Spandau Ballet while, according to Billboard, the pivotal record of the genre is Human League's "Don't You Want Me".

Arthur Baker argued that synthesizers helped to shape the new music: "I'm into synthesizers right now. The options are limitless. It cuts costs and gives you more ultimate control, but it doesn't sound made up. It still has a human feel", while the sound, composed of electronic Eurodisco influences, was generally regarded as "cold, anti-human and mechanical."

Legacy
This kind of dance-rock influenced such alternative rock acts such as Garbage, No Doubt, Robbie Williams, Scissor Sisters, Young Love, Franz Ferdinand, Arctic Monkeys, Kasabian and the Killers.

See also
List of dance-rock artists
Alternative dance
Electronic rock
Dance-punk
Electropunk
New wave music
Disco music

References

Dance-rock
Fusion music genres
American styles of music
American rock music genres
British styles of music
British rock music genres
1970s in music
1980s in music
1990s in music
Post-disco